Gregory Alan Tubbs (born August 31, 1962) is a former Major League Baseball player who played for the Cincinnati Reds in 1993. After debuting on August 1, 1993, he only appeared in 35 games before his final game later in the year. Tubbs was drafted in the 22nd round of the 1984 amateur draft by the Atlanta Braves and was traded to the Pittsburgh Pirates for Rico Rossy.

Tubbs' son, Darien, was drafted in the 16th round of the 2016 MLB Draft by the Los Angeles Dodgers.

References

External links

Living people
Major League Baseball outfielders
Cincinnati Reds players
Buffalo Bisons (minor league) players
Sumter Braves players
Indianapolis Indians players
Harrisburg Senators players
Greenville Braves players
Durham Bulls players
Richmond Braves players
Anderson Braves players
1962 births
Austin Peay Governors baseball players
Baseball players from Tennessee
People from Smithville, Tennessee
African-American baseball players